The Vektor СР1 is a semi-automatic pistol that was made in South Africa by Lyttleton Engineering Works (LIW) now Denel Land Systems, from 1996 to 2001.

Design 
The CP1 pistol was intended as a concealed carry weapon for law enforcement and civilian use. It has an unusual, streamlined design with a polymer frame and an even more unusual safety, located at the front of the trigger-guard.

In several reviews it was characterized as being a radically designed gun that looks like something straight out of a science fiction movie.  These reviews stated that it has no sharp edges, and is about as "snag-proof" as any combat gun can ever be, and because of its design it is a surprisingly comfortable gun to shoot, which makes it feel very ergonomic.

The pistol originally sold in the United States for a retail price of approximately $400. The pistol was marketed in Italy, where it was chambered for the 9×21mm IMI cartridge.

The CP1 uses a gas-delayed blowback action with a gas cylinder located below the barrel. The trigger is a single action, internal hammer.

A manual safety is located at the front of the trigger guard. To set on Safe, the button must be pressed rearward from the front; to set on Fire, the button must be pressed forward from inside the trigger guard.

The pistol is fitted with an automated trigger safety. Magazines are double stack; 10 & 12-round magazines are flush fit with the bottom of the grip, 13-round magazines have extended finger rests at the bottom.

LIW was developing a .40 S&W caliber version of the CP1, to be known as the CP1N. It is unknown if the CP1N was ever actually produced.

Recall 

In October 2000 a recall notice was issued for the Vektor CP1, because a small percentage of them had issues with the internal safety mechanisms and, when dropped, could accidentally fire. The recall states that the loaded gun can discharge if bumped or dropped. Information accompanying recall notices stated that the gun should not be loaded under any circumstances; although some firearms experts and enthusiasts may deem such recall as unnecessary for the mentioned defect, Denel probably took such steps to prevent any accident that may result in a lawsuit, as the primary export market of the Vektor CP1 pistol was the United States.

This recall ended promising sales in the USA, and terminated the life of this pistol on the market, although most of the CP1 pistols turned in from South African customers were fixed and returned to their owners. The  inability to fix and return the defective pistols from foreign markets was probably the reason behind Vektor's decision to pay $500 to anyone who turned in their gun, and to put the CP1 pistol out of production in 2001.

It is estimated that approximately 2000 of the handguns were sold in the United States prior to the recall. Most of that number were turned in, and the pistols are now very rare in the United States.  They are available in very limited numbers in South Africa and other countries.

Users 
: Seen limited use in South African Police Service. It is also popular in civilian market and private security firms.

See also

Vektor SP1, another pistol by the same manufacturer

References 

9mm Parabellum semi-automatic pistols
9×21mm IMI semi-automatic pistols
Denel
Gas-delayed blowback firearms
Semi-automatic pistols of South Africa